Kate Radley (born 19 February 1967) is an English keyboard player, best known for her work with the British rock band Spiritualized. She was a member during the time period which saw the release of the Lazer Guided Melodies, Pure Phase and Ladies and Gentlemen We Are Floating in Space albums, before leaving the band in 1997.

She has been married to musician Richard Ashcroft  since 1995. She also made a cameo appearance in the music video for Bitter Sweet Symphony by The Verve. The couple's first son, Sonny, was born on 23 March 2000. In 2004, their second son, Cassius, was born. Since her marriage, Radley has largely left the music industry, but still provides keyboard session work for several of Ashcroft's solo albums.

References

1967 births
Living people
English rock keyboardists
People educated at Rugby High School for Girls
People from Rugby, Warwickshire
Spiritualized members